Cuthonella elioti is a species of sea slug, an aeolid nudibranch, a marine gastropod mollusc in the family Cuthonellidae. It is a replacement name for Cuthonella antarctica Eliot, 1907 (non Aeolis antarctica Pfeffer in Martens & Pfeffer, 1886).

Distribution
This species was described from Winter Quarters Bay, Ross Sea, Antarctica. It has been found on several occasions in McMurdo Sound, Ross Sea, Antarctica .

References

Cuthonellidae
Gastropods described in 1944